John Dewitt Kuester Jr. (born February 6, 1955) is an American basketball coach and scout. As a player he spent three seasons in the National Basketball Association (NBA) from 1977 to 1980 and then coached in the college ranks before moving on to the NBA sidelines as an assistant. Kuester was named head coach of the Detroit Pistons in July 2009 and coached the team for two seasons.

A 6'2" (1.88 m) and 180 lb (82 kg) guard, Kuester played collegiately with the University of North Carolina Tar Heels from 1973 to 1977.

Playing career

High school
Kuester played four years at Benedictine for legendary coach Warren Rutledge. Leading his team to three consecutive state Catholic League titles, the Cadets were 31-3 his senior year.

College
Kuester played four seasons with the UNC Tar Heels under head coach Dean Smith, for whom he won two ACC championships and helped reach the NCAA tournament four times, including an appearance in the 1977 NCAA Finals, in which they lost to Marquette 67–59. In both his junior and senior year (1976 and 1977), Kuester was voted UNC's best defensive player. Also in his senior year, he was voted Most Valuable Player of the ACC Tournament and the NCAA East Regionals.

Professional
Kuester was selected with the 9th pick of the third round (53rd overall) in the 1977 NBA draft by the Kansas City Kings. He played 78 games for them in 1977–78, averaging 4.8 points, 1.5 rebounds and 3.2 assists per game. In his second and third (and final) seasons he played with the Denver Nuggets and Indiana Pacers, respectively.

Coaching career
After his playing days, Kuester began a basketball coaching career, volunteering as an assistant at the University of Richmond from 1980 to 1981. From 1981 to 1983, he was an assistant to Rick Pitino at Boston University before succeeding him in 1983 as the youngest head coach in NCAA Division I.

From 1985 to 1990, Kuester was the head coach at George Washington University. His 1988–1989 Colonials team compiled a 1–27 record, one of the worst ever in NCAA history.

He continued his career on the sidelines in the NBA, joining the Boston Celtics in 1990 and serving as an assistant from 1995 to 1997, and from 1997 to 2003 as an assistant for the Philadelphia 76ers under head coach Larry Brown. In 2003–04, Kuester followed Brown to the Detroit Pistons where he also served as an assistant. In 2004–05, Kuester was an assistant with the New Jersey Nets, and returned to the 76ers once more in 2005–06. In July 2006, he was named as an assistant coach for the Orlando Magic. In August 2007, Kuester was named to Cleveland Cavaliers head coach Mike Brown's staff, replacing the departing Kenny Natt.

In July 2009, Kuester was hired as head coach of the Detroit Pistons, replacing Michael Curry. An agreement was made after the Pistons and their first choice, Avery Johnson, broke off contract talks. On June 5, 2011, Kuester was fired from his position as head coach of the Detroit Pistons.

On June 29, 2011, he was hired as an assistant coach for the Los Angeles Lakers under new head coach Mike Brown. Since his days in Cleveland, this marked the second time Kuester has worked as an assistant coach under Brown.

On September 7, 2012, Kuester was named an advance scout for the Lakers.

Family
Kuester and wife, Tricia, have a son, John III, and a daughter, Katelyn. Katelyn ("Katie") played basketball at St. Joseph's University.

Head coaching record

College

NBA

|- 
| style="text-align:left;"|Detroit
| style="text-align:left;"|
|82||27||55||.329|| style="text-align:center;"|5th in Central||—||—||—||—
| style="text-align:center;"|Missed Playoffs
|- 
| style="text-align:left;"|Detroit
| style="text-align:left;"|
|82||30||52||.366|| style="text-align:center;"|4th in Central||—||—||—||—
| style="text-align:center;"|Missed Playoffs
|- class="sortbottom"
| style="text-align:left;"|Career
| ||164||57||107||.348|| ||—||—||—||—

References

External links
 NBA.com John Kuester coach file
 NBA stats @ basketball-reference.com

1955 births
Living people
American men's basketball coaches
American men's basketball players
Basketball coaches from Virginia
Basketball players from Richmond, Virginia
Boston Celtics assistant coaches
Boston University Terriers men's basketball coaches
Cleveland Cavaliers assistant coaches
College men's basketball head coaches in the United States
Denver Nuggets players
Detroit Pistons assistant coaches
Detroit Pistons head coaches
George Washington Colonials men's basketball coaches
Indiana Pacers players
Kansas City Kings draft picks
Kansas City Kings players
Los Angeles Lakers assistant coaches
New Jersey Nets assistant coaches
North Carolina Tar Heels men's basketball players
Orlando Magic assistant coaches
Parade High School All-Americans (boys' basketball)
Philadelphia 76ers assistant coaches
Point guards
Sportspeople from Richmond, Virginia